Estancia High School is located in Costa Mesa, California and is part of the Newport-Mesa Unified School District which serves approximately 21,000 students who reside in the cities of Newport Beach and Costa Mesa.  Estancia High School is a comprehensive high school which serves the needs of approximately 1,200 students in Grades 9-12.

Academics
Estancia High School offers a college prep curriculum. Currently, fourteen Advanced Placement courses are being offered. In fall 2015, Estancia High School launched an Engineering & Design Signature Academy for students entering Grade 9.

Engineering Design Signature Academy
Estancia's Engineering Design pathway employs Project Lead the Way curriculum with a focus on Advanced Manufacturing. Students progress through a 4 course pathway:
 Introduction to Engineering Design (Freshmen)
 Principles of Engineering
 Computer Integrated Manufacturing
 Engineering Design Development (Senior/Capstone)

Co-Curricular Programs
Students at Estancia High School can become involved in the following programs:
 Drama 
 Music
 Field Studies
 Youth & Government
 Journalism
 Yearbook
 ASB
 Estancia Medical Academy (EMA)
 Academic Decathlon
 Australia Sister City Education Exchange Program

Athletics
Estancia is part of the Orange Coast League of the CIF Southern Section, part of the California Interscholastic Federation.

The school offers varsity teams in: Football, Boys and Girls Volleyball, Cheerleading, Boys and Girls Waterpolo, Boys and Girls Tennis, Boys and Girls Cross Country, Boys and Girls Track & field, Boys and Girls Basketball, Boys and Girls Soccer, Coed Wrestling, Boys and Girls Golf, Girls Softball, and Baseball.

Fall Sports
 Football
 Girls' Volleyball
 Boys' Water Polo
 Girls' Tennis
 Girls' Golf
 Coed Cross Country

Winter Sports
 Boys' & Girls' Basketball
 Boys' & Girls' Soccer
 Girls' Water Polo
 Coed Wrestling

Spring Sports
 Boys' Baseball
 Girls' Softball
 Boys' Volleyball
 Boys' Golf
 Coed Swimming
 Coed Track & Field
 Boys’ Tennis

Estancia High School's rival is Costa Mesa High School. Each sport plays Costa Mesa High School in the annual Battle of the Bell. The winner of the Battle of the Bell houses the "bell" for the school year. Estancia High School currently houses the bells for football, boys' basketball and girls' basketball. Estancia High School has also been in the recipient of the All Sports Trophy sponsored by Newport Rib Company for the past six school years.

Notable alumni
Rich Amaral, Former Major League Baseball player (Seattle Mariners, Baltimore Orioles)
Spencer Kayden, Actress
Rony Argueta, Professional soccer player
Jeff Gardner, Former Major League Baseball player (New York Mets, San Diego Padres, Montreal Expos)
Mitchell Hurwitz, creator of the television show Arrested Development. Graduated in 1981.
 Tom Jancar, contemporary art dealer Jancar Kuhlenschmidt Gallery
Allan Mansoor, Assemblymember representing the 74th Assembly District and former mayor of Costa Mesa
 Matt Fuerbringer, Professional Beach Volleyball player, Class of 1992
Jeff Graham, gridiron football player
Ron Kravette, US National Ice Dance Champion.  Graduated in 1981.
Wing Lam, Co-founder and face of restaurant chain Wahoo's Fish Taco. Graduated in 1979.

References

High schools in Orange County, California
Public high schools in California
1965 establishments in California